Ronnie Specter is an American make-up artist who was nominated at the 65th Academy Awards in the category of Best Makeup for her work on the film Batman Returns. She shared her nomination with Ve Neill and Stan Winston.

She also graduated at the Joe Blasco make-up academy 

She has worked on over 90 films since 1984.

References

External links

Living people
Place of birth missing (living people)
Year of birth missing (living people)
American make-up artists